Roger Ferdinand (1898–1967) was a French playwright and screenwriter.

Selected filmography
 Levy and Company (1930)
 Chotard and Company (1933)
 A Man of Gold (1934)
 President Haudecoeur (1940)
 Mademoiselle Béatrice (1943)
 Distress (1946)

References

Bibliography
 Goble, Alan. The Complete Index to Literary Sources in Film. Walter de Gruyter, 1999.

External links

People from Saint-Lô
1898 births
1967 deaths
20th-century French dramatists and playwrights
20th-century French screenwriters